Jen Mann (born 1987) is a Canadian artist known for large scale hyperrealistic portraiture. Mann graduated from OCAD University in 2009 with a BFA in printmaking and won the 2015 Kingston Prize for portraiture.

Exhibitions
Subconscious Vista at Gallery 1313, Toronto, ON (2011)
Gathering of the Psyche at the Communication Gallery, Toronto, ON (2012)
Daydream Believer at Neubacher Shor Contemporary Art Gallery, Toronto, ON (2012)
 Strange Beauties at Neubacher Shor Contemporary Art Gallery, Toronto, ON (2013)
Q&A at the Neubacher Shor Contemporary Art Gallery, Toronto, ON (2014)
Sweet Nothing at Cordesa Fine Art Gallery, Los Angeles, CA (2016)
Notes On Love at Duran Mashaal Gallery, Montreal, QC (2018)
Send Pix at Arsham/Fieg Gallery, New York, NY (2019)
Metonymy at Gallery Jones, Vancouver, BC (2019)

References

1987 births
Living people
Artists from Toronto
Canadian portrait painters
21st-century Canadian painters
Canadian women painters
OCAD University alumni
21st-century Canadian women artists
Canadian portrait artists